Moccas is a village and civil parish in the English county of Herefordshire. The population of the civil parish taken at the 2011 census was 105.

The parish is mainly farmland with a number of woods, including Woodbury Hill Wood and the Moccas Park Deer Park (though mostly in Dorstone parish). The parish church of St Michael is well known as the site of the very early Welsh Moccas Monastery, founded by Saint Dubricius in the 6th century, as recorded in the Book of Llandaff. The church has a notable monument to the de Fresnes family, lords of the manor in the 14th century.

Moccas Court, north of the village, replaced the old manor house which once stood next to the church. It is a fine Georgian country house, now a hotel, built between 1776 and 1783 for the Cornewall family by the architect Anthony Keck.

The name Moccas probably derives from the Welsh Moch-rhos, meaning pig land, according to the Moccas village history website.

References

External links 

Photos of Moccas and surrounding area on geograph
History of Moccas in Herefordshire
Moccas Court

Villages in Herefordshire